The Kaesong Bang clan is a Korean clan. According to the census held in 2015, the population of the Kaesong Bang clan was 851. Their founder was  who was a descendant of Pang I wei. Pang I wei was a general during the Zhou dynasty during the King Xian of Zhou’s reign.  entered Goryeo as one of the Hanlin Academy when he worked as the government post named zhong shu she ren in 1351. At that time, Queen Noguk had a marriage to an ordinary person planned by Gongmin of Goryeo.

See also 
 Korean clan names of foreign origin

References

External links 
 

 
Korean clan names of Chinese origin